Niki Christina Ashton  (born September 9, 1982) is a Canadian politician. She is the New Democratic Member of Parliament for the federal electoral district of Churchill—Keewatinook Aski in Manitoba, Canada. She was first elected in the 2008 federal election. Ashton announced her intention to run for the leadership of the federal NDP on March 7, 2017. She placed third in the October 1, 2017 election.

Early life
Ashton was born in Thompson, Manitoba. She is the daughter of Hariklia Dimitrakopoulou and former Manitoba provincial NDP cabinet minister Steve Ashton. Her father is English-born, and her mother is of Greek descent. Ashton has one younger brother, Alexander. She attended École Riverside School and R. D. Parker Collegiate. She later attended the Li Po Chun United World College in Hong Kong. She has a B.A in Global Political Economy from the University of Manitoba, and an M.A. in international affairs from Carleton University. She has been an instructor at the University College of the North.

She studied human rights and social justice at the Norman Paterson School of International Affairs.

In 2004, she was a coordinator and promoter of volunteering at the 2004 Summer Olympics in Athens. With her knowledge of Greek she assisted the Canadian and Chinese Olympic teams.

Career

In 2005, she defeated incumbent New Democratic Party Member of Parliament Bev Desjarlais for the NDP nomination due, in part, to the same-sex marriage issue after Desjarlais broke party ranks to vote against the Civil Marriage Act. Desjarlais subsequently quit the party, sat as an independent for the remainder of her term, and ran against Ashton as an independent candidate in the election in the Churchill riding in the 2006 Canadian federal election. Ashton's major themes in her campaign included getting federal funding for the University College of the North, as well as getting a federal government northern development agreement.

Although the labour unions in Thompson endorsed Ashton, the NDP vote nevertheless split between Ashton and Desjarlais, and the riding was won by Liberal Party candidate Tina Keeper.

Ashton defeated Keeper in the 2008 election to regain the riding for the NDP.

On November 7, 2011, in Montreal, Ashton launched her campaign as the ninth person to join the 2012 NDP leadership race. At the age of 29, she was the youngest of the candidates. She placed seventh with 5.7% of the vote at the March 24, 2012 leadership election and was eliminated on the first ballot.

Since first being elected in 2008, Ashton was elected as the Chair of the House of Commons Standing Committee on the Status of Women in the 40th Parliament of Canada, as has served as the NDP Post-Secondary and Youth critic, as the Rural and Community Development critic and from 2012 to 2014 as the Status of Women Critic. On January 23, 2015, Ashton was appointed as the Aboriginal Affairs Critic in Canada's Official Opposition.

After the 2015 federal election, Ashton was appointed the NDP critic for Jobs, Employment and Workforce Development in the 42nd Canadian Parliament.

Ashton announced her candidacy for the 2017 NDP leadership election on March 7, 2017. She placed third in the October 1, 2017 election, with 17.4% of the vote, just over 1,000 votes behind runner up Charlie Angus. Jagmeet Singh was elected leader on the first ballot.

Ashton was re-elected in the 2019 federal election. She was stripped of her critic roles on January 1, 2021 after revealing to the public on Twitter that she had travelled to Greece during the 2020 COVID-19 second wave to visit an "ailing grandmother."  
She had not informed party leadership of her travel plans beforehand. She was re-elected in the 2021 federal election.

Political views

Domestic policy
During the 2017 New Democratic Party leadership election Ashton ran on a platform including:
 A focus on plans to create and maintain good-paying jobs for young people and working Canadians, and tackle the threat of climate change.
 A commitment to providing tuition-free post-secondary education.
 Advocating combatting the unequal distribution of wealth, the loss of value-added jobs, the "foreign ownership and trade deals that are selling us out".

Niki Ashton criticizes the Canada Infrastructure Bank for only funding public-private partnerships, and for its failure to complete any of its projects after four years of existence. In February 2022, Ashton introduced a bill to rewrite its mandate focus on projects that tackle the impacts of climate change, and to fund publicly-owned infrastructure instead of trying to implicate private finance.

Foreign policy

During the 2019 Venezuelan presidential crisis Ashton tweeted the following: "PM Trudeau sides with [U.S. President Donald] Trump's regime change agenda and Brazil's fascist President in support of someone calling for a military coup in Venezuela," Ashton said on Twitter.

"No! We cannot support an agenda of economic or military coups. #HandsOffVenezuela."

Ashton has been a critic of the extradition case against Meng Wanzhou. She has "sponsored a petition in the House of Commons that calls for Meng’s immediate release; urged the government to “protect Canadian jobs” by allowing Huawei to participate in the roll-out of 5G in Canada; and encouraged a foreign policy review to develop an “independent” foreign policy on China." In November 2020, she organized a “Free Meng” event with the Canadian Foreign Policy Institute, the Canadian Peace Congress and the Hamilton Coalition to Stop War.

She is against the United States embargo against Cuba, and sponsored a petition in the House of Commons calling for the lifting of the embargo.

Personal life
Ashton can read, write and speak four languages: English, French, Greek and Spanish. She has also taken lessons in Cree, Russian, Turkish, Ukrainian and Mandarin.

Ashton married Ryan Barker in 2011. They separated in 2015 and divorced in 2017.

In May 2017, Ashton announced that she was pregnant. She gave birth to twin boys in November 2017. She has stated that "Like millions of Canadian women I will carry on my work", and continued with her leadership campaign.

Electoral record

References

External links

1982 births
Living people
21st-century Canadian politicians
21st-century Canadian women politicians
Canadian democratic socialists
Canadian educators
Canadian feminists
Canadian people of English descent
Canadian people of Greek descent
Carleton University alumni
Canadian LGBT rights activists
Members of the House of Commons of Canada from Manitoba
New Democratic Party MPs
People from Thompson, Manitoba
University of Manitoba alumni
People educated at a United World College
Women in Manitoba politics
Women members of the House of Commons of Canada
Canadian socialists